Adrian Nikolaus Zenz (born 1974)<ref>{{Cite book|url=https://books.google.com/books?id=OMh-ngEACAAJ |title=Tibetanness' Under Threat? |isbn=9789004257962 |access-date=July 31, 2020 |archive-date=October 1, 2020 |archive-url=https://web.archive.org/web/20201001233200/https://books.google.ch/books/about/Tibetanness_Under_Threat.html?id=OMh-ngEACAAJ&redir_esc=y |url-status=live |last1=Zenz |first1=Adrian |year=2014 }}</ref> is a German anthropologist known for his studies of the Xinjiang internment camps (also known as "re-education" camps) and Uyghur genocide. He is a senior fellow in China studies at the Victims of Communism Memorial Foundation, an anti-communist think tank established by the US government and based in Washington, DC.

Career
Zenz received a master's degree in development studies from the University of Auckland after which he managed development projects in China.U.S. Congress, Subcommittee on Asia, the Pacific and Nonproliferation, Hearing: Authoritarianism with Chinese Characteristics: Political and Religious Human Rights Challenges in China, "Witness Biography", December 4, 2019. He later received a PhD in social anthropology from the University of Cambridge, with a doctoral thesis on minority education, job opportunities, and the ethnic identity of young Tibetans in western China. He is a fluent speaker of Mandarin Chinese.

He was a lecturer in social research methodology at the European School of Culture and Theology, a joint venture between the Evangelical theological institution  and Columbia International University, where he advised doctoral students. In the summer of 2018, he moved from Europe to the United States. As of 2021, he is a senior fellow in China studies at the Victims of Communism Memorial Foundation.

Zenz also serves as an advisor to the Inter-Parliamentary Alliance on China.

Anthropology
Xinjiang
Zenz's most influential work has been his research on the mass detention of Uyghurs and other Turkic Muslim minorities within China's Xinjiang internment camps. Zenz was one of the first researchers to have revealed the existence, size, and scope of these camps.

Since February 2018, Zenz has studied the mass detention of Uyghurs in internment camps in Xinjiang. His work has been based on Chinese government budget plans, bidding papers, leaked documents, spreadsheets, and other official documents. In a May 2018 report published by the Washington, D.C.-based Jamestown Foundation, Zenz initially estimated the number of detained Muslims to range from 100,000 to just over 1 million. Zenz based this estimate on documents published by Istiqlal, a Turkey-based Uyghur exile media organization, which had reportedly been leaked by anonymous Chinese public security officials in the region, along with two reports on Muslim detention quotas by Shohret Hoshur for Radio Free Asia. He then extrapolated from these figures and incorporated information from former detainees and public Chinese government documents that gave indications of the sizes and numbers of the camps.

Since then, his estimate has been cited widely, with many sources, including experts on a United Nations human rights panel, preferring to use the higher end of the estimate's range, while other scholars have questioned its accuracy. Later, in March 2019, Zenz provided a higher speculative estimate to the United Nations that 1.5 million Uyghurs had been detained in camps, saying that his number accounted for both the increases in the size and scope of detention in the region and public reporting on the stories of Uyghur exiles with family in internment camps. In July 2019, Zenz wrote in the Journal of Political Risk that he speculated that 1.5 million Uyghurs had been extrajudicially detained, which he described as being "an equivalent to just under one in six adult members of a Turkic and predominantly Muslim minority group in Xinjiang." In November 2019, Zenz estimated that the number of internment camps in Xinjiang had surpassed 1,000. In July 2020, Zenz wrote in Foreign Policy that his estimate had increased since November 2019, estimating that a total of 1.8 million Uyghurs and other Muslim minorities had been extrajudicially detained in what he described as "the largest incarceration of an ethnoreligious minority since the Holocaust," arguing that the Chinese Government was engaging in policies in violation of the United Nations Convention on the Prevention and Punishment of the Crime of Genocide.

Zenz has also researched publicly available Chinese government documents that showed that the Chinese government has spent tens of millions of dollars since 2016 on a birth control surgery program that includes cash incentives for sterilization procedures. Zenz's research showed that birth control violations are punishable by internment in the Xinjiang internment camps, a conclusion that has been corroborated by an Associated Press investigation, which also found that women in Xinjiang were forcibly sterilized and subject to forced abortions. According to Zenz, population growth rates in the two largest Uyghur prefectures in Xinjiang, Kashgar and Hotan, fell by 84% between 2015 and 2018 due to forced sterilization, contraception, and abortions on Uyghurs.

In June 2021, Zenz published a 28-page study in Central Asian Survey arguing that China has carried population control in Xinjiang with the explicit "long-term" intent to reduce population growth of the Uyghur ethnic minority.

Zenz published the Xinjiang Police Files, a collection of official police documents he received from anonymous hackers in May 2022. The files include instructions on operating the camps, speeches, and thousands of mug shots taken in 2018.

Tibet
Zenz is the author of 'Tibetanness' Under Threat?, a study of the modern Tibetan education system. In the book, he examines the career prospects of students who major in Tibetan-language studies and the notion that the greater market value of Chinese-language education threatens Tibetan ethnocultural survival.

In September 2020, Zenz authored a report that said that 500,000 Tibetans, mostly subsistence farmers and herders, were trained in the first seven months of 2020 in military-style training centres; According to BBC News, experts have said these centres "are akin to labour camps".

Theology
Zenz is a lapsed Catholic-turned-born-again Christian, and has stated that he feels "led by God" in his research on Chinese Muslims and other minority groups. Zenz co-authored a book in 2012 with his father-in-law, Marlon L. Sias, titled Worthy to Escape: Why All Believers Will Not Be Raptured Before the Tribulation.

 Reception 
Zenz has been the target of a pro-Beijing disinformation campaign, according to U.S.-based cybersecurity firm Mandiant. A fabricated letter was spread through fake news sites which alleged that Zenz received direct funding from US government entities.

 Xinjiang 
Zenz's work to expose human rights abuses in Xinjiang has been the subject of widespread international attention and has been widely cited in media reports.

An analysis published by the Mercator Institute for China Studies in January 2019 said that estimates by Zenz and others that 1 million Uyghurs had been subject to extrajudicial detention were "credible but remain unavoidably imprecise" and cited Zenz's 2018 study as one of two important studies that "popularized" this number. Zenz's work has been described by the Frankfurter Allgemeine Zeitung as delivering solid evidence for the extent of the repression that had only been previously known through anecdotal evidence.

As a result of his work on Xinjiang, Zenz has become a target for coordinated disinformation attacks from pro-Beijing and Chinese state-run media, as well as other state-affiliated entities. Zenz and his work on Xinjiang have been criticized by the Chinese government, which, according to The Globe and Mail, "has called his findings 'lies'—even when it confirmed them." In March 2021, Chinese state media reported that Chinese companies have filed a lawsuit in Xinjiang against Zenz to recoup economic losses and restore their reputations in response to what Chinese Foreign Ministry spokesman Zhao Lijian described as "Zenz's 'rumors' of forced labor in the region". This lawsuit is one in a series of steps that the Chinese government is taking in order to attack critics of Chinese government policies in Xinjiang. On April 2, 2021, a court in Kashgar accepted the civil case brought by a textile company in Xinjiang against Zenz for defamation. During an interview with The Daily Telegraph published in May 2021, Zenz defended himself against allegations of fabrication, noting that 95% of documents he has analyzed are publicly available government records. Zenz has become the target of repeated cyber attacks, receiving many attempted hacking attacks via email from people posing as Uyghurs.

The European Union, United States, United Kingdom, and Canada imposed coordinated sanctions against Chinese government officials over human rights abuses in Xinjiang in March 2021. The United States banned imports of cotton from Xinjiang shortly after Zenz published a report describing widespread use of forced labor in the region. The Chinese government responded by imposing retaliatory sanctions against Zenz and others who had criticized the Chinese government for its human rights abuses in Xinjiang, including nine other people (five of whom are members of the European Parliament), two European Union bodies, the Mercator Institute for China Studies, and the Alliance of Democracies Foundation. The sanctions against Zenz prohibit him from entering the People's Republic of China and restrict his ability to do business with Chinese firms.

 Tibet 
A 2019 article in Frankfurter Allgemeine Zeitung described Zenz's research methods on Tibetans as unconventional and exciting little interest in the professional world. The article stated that Zenz had analyzed job postings for security personnel in Tibet, compared them with data on self-immolation by Tibetans, and then used that data to draw his conclusions about the Chinese government's policies of repression. Development studies researcher Andrew Fischer described Zenz's early work as an "excellent discussion" of Tibetan education that included "interesting ways of measuring and representing" school outcomes and as offering a "rare insight" into Tibetan education with "fascinating" details and of "immense value".<ref>{{cite journal |title=Reviewed Work(s): Tibetanness' under Threat? Neo-integrationism, Minority Education and Career Strategies in Qinghai, P.R. China by Adrian Zenz |first=Andrew M. |last=Fischer |journal=The China Quarterly |volume=219 |year=2014 |pages=886–888 |doi=10.1017/S0305741014000927 |jstor=24740656 |s2cid=154326730 |url=https://www.jstor.org/stable/24740656 |access-date=December 30, 2020 |archive-date=June 23, 2021 |archive-url=https://web.archive.org/web/20210623203027/https://www.jstor.org/stable/24740656 |url-status=live }}</ref>

In 2020, a report from Reuters wrote that the news agency had "corroborated Zenz’s findings and found additional policy documents, company reports, procurement filings and state media reports" regarding a growing mass labor program in Tibet. The Chinese Foreign Ministry said in response that workers were voluntary and strongly denied the involvement of forced labor.

Robert Barnett, the former Director of the Modern Tibetan Studies Program at Columbia University, wrote in March 2021 that Zenz's work on Tibet is generally "well-regarded" and noted that Zenz has been subject to unfair and abusive attacks from Chinese state media. Barnett, however, criticized the methods used in creating a report written by Zenz and published in September 2020 by the Jamestown Foundation, writing that the report had not been peer-reviewed prior to publication, did not refer to the findings of other Tibet researchers, and had not been independently verified by field research. Barnett also criticized the timing of and media coverage surrounding the report's publication, arguing that it had been "coordinated with a prominent media campaign" and that prominent newspapers have misrepresented the report by overstating Zenz's conclusions regarding the existence of labor camps in Tibet.

Selected works
 2012. Worthy to Escape: Why All Believers Will Not Be Raptured Before the Tribulation, with Marlon L. Sias. Bloomington, IN: Westbow Press, . 
 2013. 'Tibetanness' Under Threat?: Neo-Integrationism, Minority Education and Career Strategies in Qinghai, P.R. China. Brill, .
 2017 March 14. “Xinjiang’s Rapidly Evolving Security State,” with James Leibold. China Brief 17(4). The Jamestown Foundation.
 2017 September 21. “Chen Quanguo: The Strongman Behind Beijing’s Securitization Strategy in Tibet and Xinjiang,” with James Leibold. China Brief 17(12).
 2018.  (via Academia.edu).
 Condensed: “New Evidence for China’s Political Re-Education Campaign in Xinjiang.” China Brief 18(10). The Jamestown Foundation.
 2019 July 1. “Brainwashing, Police Guards and Coercive Internment: Evidence from Chinese Government Documents about the Nature and Extent of Xinjiang’s ‘Vocational Training Internment Camps’.” Journal of Political Risk 7(7).
 2019 July 4. “Break Their Roots: Evidence for China’s Parent-Child Separation Campaign in Xinjiang.” Journal of Political Risk 7(7).
 2019 Dec 10. ““Beyond the Camps: Beijing’s Long-Term Scheme of Coercive Labor, Poverty Alleviation and Social Control in Xinjiang”, Journal of Political Risk 7(12), 10.12.2019 . 
 2020 February 17. “The Karakax List: Dissecting the Anatomy of Beijing’s Internment Drive in Xinjiang.” Journal of Political Risk 8(2).
 2020 June. “Sterilizations, IUDs, and Mandatory Birth Control: The CCP’s Campaign to Suppress Uyghur Birthrates in Xinjiang.” The Jamestown Foundation.
2020 September. “Xinjiang’s System of Militarized Vocational Training Comes to Tibet.” China Brief 20(17). The Jamestown Foundation.
 2020 December 14. “Coercive Labor in Xinjiang: Labor Transfer and the Mobilization of Ethnic Minorities to Pick Cotton.” Center for Global Policy.
 2021 August 24 "' End the dominance of the Uyghur ethnic group': an analysis of Beijing's population optimization strategy in southern Xinjiang". Central Asian Survey. 40''' (3): 291–312.
 2021 December 9 "The Xinjiang Papers: An Analysis of Key Findings and Implications for the Uyghur Tribunal in London", overview of the 11 leaked Chinese government documents.

See also
Ethan Gutmann

References

External links

Adrian Zenz, Jamestown Foundation.
Interview with NPR

German anthropologists
German evangelicals
1974 births
German sinologists
Living people
21st-century anthropologists
University of Auckland alumni
Alumni of the University of Cambridge
German anti-communists
Xinjiang experts